Boyan Kotsev (born 24 April 1930) is a Bulgarian cyclist. He competed at the 1952 and 1960 Summer Olympics.

References

External links
 

1930 births
Living people
Bulgarian male cyclists
Olympic cyclists of Bulgaria
Cyclists at the 1952 Summer Olympics
Cyclists at the 1960 Summer Olympics
Sportspeople from Sofia